The Ovens Murray subregion is part of the Hume region in north eastern Victoria. 
It includes the municipalities of Alpine Shire, City of Wodonga, Rural City of Benalla, Rural City of Wangaratta, Shire of Indigo, Shire of Mansfield, Shire of Towong.

Ovens-Murray is commonly used to refer to sporting bodies and recreational activities associated with the area, such as Australian rules football and swimming.

History

See also
 Ovens and Murray Advertiser
 Ovens & Murray Football League

References